Kaeson Station is a station on Chŏllima Line of the Pyongyang Metro. It is located near the Arch of Triumph and Kaeson Youth Park.

The station was refurbished in 2019 with new lighting and TVs to entertain waiting passengers, as well as LED signs showing train information and local weather.

The mural is called The People Rise up in the Building of a New Country.

References

External links
 

Railway stations opened in 1973
Pyongyang Metro stations
1973 establishments in North Korea